Lianzhou Township is a township under the administration of Yongxin County, Jiangxi, China. , it has 9 villages under its administration.

References 

Township-level divisions of Jiangxi
Yongxin County